Elise Matthews (born 6 June 1993) is a British female acrobatic gymnast. With partners Georgia Lancaster and Millie Spalding, Matthews achieved gold in the 2014 Acrobatic Gymnastics World Championships.

References

External links
 

1993 births
Living people
British acrobatic gymnasts
Female acrobatic gymnasts
Medalists at the Acrobatic Gymnastics World Championships
21st-century British women